Adversus Haereses is the commonly used Latin title for a book by the Church Father Irenaeus, Bishop of Lyon in Gaul (now France). It is also often cited as Against Heresies or On the Detection and Overthrow of the So-Called Gnosis. It is a five-volume work against Gnosticism and other Christian heresies, written around 180 CE.

It is sometimes confused with:

Panarion (medicine-chest), also a work in opposition to heresies, written in the 4th century by Epiphanius of Salamis.
Adversus omnes haereses, an appendix to the work De praescriptionem haereticorum by Tertullian, who lived c. 160–c. 225. Most scholars believe that the appendix is not by Tertullian but was added later; it is therefore attributed to a Pseudo-Tertullian.